Egremont may refer to:

Places
 Egremont, Cumbria, England
 Egremont, Merseyside, England
 Egremont, Massachusetts, United States
 Egremont, Alberta, Canada

Other uses
 Earl of Egremont
 Egremont Street - short lived name for portion of Queen Street in Toronto